D.V. Moanda, born Vital Moanda-di Veta (?-1984) was percussionist and conga player of the band Zaiko Langa Langa, from Congo-Kinshasa later called Zaire, now called the Democratic Republic of Congo. He is well known in the Congolese public for his congolese music legacy and as a founder of the famous band Zaiko, in 1969.
D.V. Moanda died in 1984 in Kinshasa.

References

https://www.myspace.com/zaikolangalangafanpage

http://www.kasaflo.net/artistes/liste/zaiko/biographie3.htm

Year of birth missing
1984 deaths
Democratic Republic of the Congo musicians